Sault-au-Récollet (English: Recollet Rapids) is a neighbourhood in Montreal. It is located in the eastern edge of the borough of Ahuntsic-Cartierville, bordering the Rivière des Prairies. Autoroute 19 connects Sault-au-Récollet to Laval. The neighbourhood was designated as a heritage site by the City of Montreal in 1992. The Church of the Visitation at Sault-au-Récollet is the oldest church on the Island of Montreal and was built between 1749 and 1752. The streetcar suburb was annexed by Montreal to from the former borough of Ahuntsic-Bordeaux in 1918. A housing boom, mostly made up of multiplexes, followed in the 1940s and 1950s.

Fort Lorette 

The Sulpician missionaries had been operating a mission to the indigenous peoples of the area at Fort de la Montagne for about 20 years when they decided to move to Sault-au-Récollet. Part of this decision was due to an increase in brandy trade and exposure to alcoholism, and part was to move the fort to a more easily defended section of the island. 
 In 1696, a flock of 210 Algonquins was moved to Fort Lorette under the guidance of Fr Robert Gay.

Gallery

See also
 Île de la Visitation
 Papineau-Leblanc Bridge

References

Neighbourhoods in Montreal
Ahuntsic-Cartierville
Heritage sites in Quebec (Cultural Heritage Act)